Raúl María Valencia Muñoz (20 March 1976 – 19 October 2012) was a Spanish professional footballer who played as a central defender.

Career
Born in Seville, Valencia played for Xerez, Atlético Sanluqueño, San Fernando de Cádiz Mallorca B, Albacete, AD Ceuta and Girona.

Later life and death
Valencia died on 19 October 2012 following a long illness.

References

1976 births
2012 deaths
Spanish footballers
Xerez CD footballers
CD San Fernando players
RCD Mallorca B players
Albacete Balompié players
AD Ceuta footballers
Girona FC players

Association football defenders
Footballers from Seville